The 1984 Nobel Prize in Literature was awarded to the czech writer Jaroslav Seifert "for his poetry which endowed with freshness, sensuality and rich inventiveness provides a liberating image of the indomitable spirit and versatility of man."

Laureate

Jaroslav Seifert was a journalist and poet. His first book of poems published in 1920 reflected his youthful expectations of communism, but he was later less enchanted with that system of government and his poetry became more lyrical with the history and other aspects of Czechoslovakia as a common theme. In 1977 he was among the first to sign the petition Charter 77. Seifert published about 30 volumes of poetry as well as journalism, children's literature and a memoir.

Candidates
Frequently mentioned favourites to win the 1984 Nobel Prize in Literature were Jorge Luis Borges, Graham Greene, Günter Grass (awarded in 1999), Marguerite Yourcenar and Claude Simon (awarded in 1985).

Reactions
Jaroslav Seifert was regarded a National poet in his home country, but although he had achieved some international recognision was little known elsewhere.  The 83 year old and hospitalised Seifert was said to be overjoyed to hear that he had been awarded the Nobel Prize in Literature. The official czechoslovak press agency CTK praised Seifert for his "positive attitude to man's struggle for social justice."

References

External links
 Award ceremony speech

1984
1984 in literature